James Teer ( – 30 April 1887) was a New Zealand goldminer, mariner and castaway. He was born in Newcastle, County Down, Ireland, in about 1826. He emigrated to Australia at the age of 18. He was a passenger aboard the  when it was shipwrecked in the Auckland Islands, and was one of only 10 survivors out of a total of 83 people aboard.

References

Bibliography 

 

1820s births
1887 deaths
Australian gold prospectors
Castaways
History of the New Zealand outlying islands
Irish emigrants to colonial Australia
Irish emigrants to New Zealand (before 1923)
New Zealand gold prospectors
New Zealand sailors
People from County Down
Shipwreck survivors